Shankarrao Bajirao Patil (15 February 1924 – 13 September 2006) was an Indian politician who served as Member of Parliament between 1980–1984 and 1989-1991 from Baramati parliamentary constituency. He was also Member of Legislative Assembly of Bombay state between 1952 and 1957, partially between 1957–60 and then of Maharashtra between 1962 and 1967, 1967-72 1972–78, and 1978–80. He was Minister of State between 1962–74 and Cabinet Minister in Government of Maharashtra during 1974–78.

Early life and family
Patil completed his Bachelor of Arts from Fergusson College and LL.B. from I.L.S. Law College Pune. Harshavardhan Patil, a senior minister in Maharashtra is his nephew.

Career
Member
 Maharashtra Legislative Assembly, 1952–57, 1957–62, 1962–67, 1967-72 1972–78, 1978–80
 Lok Sabha, 1980–84 and 1989–91.

Positions
Gen. Secy. PCC (I) Maharashtra, 1978–80

President
 Ex-Chairman and Founder, Indapur Sahakari Sakhar Karkhana, Pune
 Ex-Chairman, Indapur Shikshan Prasarak Mandal
 Ex-Chairman, Shivaji Education Society, Bawada

References

External links
Official biographical sketch in Parliament of India website

1924 births
2006 deaths
Lok Sabha members from Maharashtra
Members of the Maharashtra Legislative Council
Maharashtra MLAs 1962–1967
Maharashtra MLAs 1967–1972
Maharashtra MLAs 1972–1978
Maharashtra MLAs 1978–1980
Marathi politicians
Indian National Congress politicians
Maharashtra MLAs 1960–1962
People from Baramati
India MPs 1980–1984
India MPs 1989–1991
Indian National Congress politicians from Maharashtra